Seco or SECO may refer to:

Gastronomy
 Seco (wine), dry wine
 Seco (food), an Ecuadorian meat dish
 Seco Herrerano, the national alcoholic beverage of Panamá

People
David Seco (born 1973), Spanish professional racing cyclist 
Hugo Seco (born 1988), Portuguese professional footballer
Manuel Seco (born 1928), Spanish lexicographer
María Luisa Seco (1948–1988), Spanish television presenter
Myriam Seco (born 1967), Spanish archaeologist

Places
 Seco River may refer to Arroyo Seco (disambiguation) or Río Seco (disambiguation)
 Seco, Kentucky, a small town in the United States
 The ICAO airport code for Francisco de Orellana Airport, Ecuador
Seco Island, in the Philippines

Science
 seco-, chemical prefix indicating cleavage of a ring with addition of one or more hydrogen atoms at each terminal group
 Secobarbital
 Seco (butterfly), a genus of metalmark butterflies in the tribe Riodinini
 Seco (tobacco), the mid-level leaves of a tobacco plant
 Second Engine Cut-Off, the shutdown of the second stage, a major milestone in the ascent of a multistage rocket

Other uses
 Seco Rail, a French railway company
SECO, a Sweden based Metal-Cutting Tool Manufacturer. Part of Sandvik
SECO Manufacturing CO, a California based Surveying Equipment and Accessories Manufacturer. Part of Trimble
 The Swiss State Secretariat for Economic Affairs